The 1998 NHL Expansion Draft was an expansion draft held by the National Hockey League (NHL) to fill the roster of the league's expansion team for the 1998–99 season, the Nashville Predators. The draft took place on June 26, 1998, in Buffalo, New York, U.S.

Rules
The Predators were to select 26 players, one from each of the 26 existing franchises at the time of the draft.

First- and second-year pros were exempt from being selected in the draft. Each of the 26 franchises in the league were allowed to protect either one goaltender, five defensemen and nine forwards or two goaltenders, three defensemen and seven forwards.

Of the unprotected players, each franchise had to include at least one forward and one defenseman who appeared in 40 games in the 1997–98 season. Each franchise also had to include at least one goaltender who appeared in 10 games in the 1997–98 season, and a minimum of 25 games since the 1995–96 season. These minimums for goaltenders were put into place in order to avoid manipulation of rosters, such as what occurred before the 1992 NHL Expansion Draft, which weakened the talent pool available in the draft.

This draft was interesting in that some of the players the Predators chose (e.g. Mike Richter and Uwe Krupp) were set to become unrestricted free agents on July 1, just days after the draft. The Predators knew they would have little chance to sign these players; however, they received a compensatory pick in the 1999 NHL Entry Draft for each player they "lost".

Protected players

Eastern Conference

Western Conference

Draft results
These results are numbered 1–26 for aesthetic purposes, but the players were not necessarily chosen in this order. As the Predators were the only team participating in the draft, the order is inconsequential.

Deals
In return for agreeing not to select certain unprotected players, the Predators were granted concessions by other franchises. The trades not involving Nashville draft picks all officially were booked as being for "future considerations":

Calgary traded Jim Dowd to Nashville after the Predators agreed not to select a goaltender from the Flames.
Chicago traded Sergei Krivokrasov to Nashville after the Predators agreed not to select Chris Terreri.
Los Angeles traded Kimmo Timonen and Jan Vopat to Nashville after the Predators agreed not to select Garry Galley.
Montreal traded Sebastien Bordeleau to Nashville after the Predators agreed not to select Peter Popovic.
Philadelphia traded Dominic Roussel and Jeff Staples to Nashville after the Predators agreed not to select Paul Coffey (Nashville also sent the Flyers a seventh-round pick (Cam Ondrik) in the 1998 NHL Entry Draft).
San Jose traded Ville Peltonen to Nashville after the Predators agreed not to select Tony Granato (Nashville also sent the Sharks a fifth-round pick (Josh Blackburn) in the 1998 NHL Entry Draft).
St. Louis traded Darren Turcotte to Nashville after the Predators agreed not to select Jamie McLennan.

Post-draft
Several of the players selected by the Predators in the Expansion Draft did not stay with the team long after the draft. Among those moved before the start of the 1998–99 season were the following:

Mike Sullivan (traded to Phoenix for a pick in the 1999 NHL Entry Draft on June 30, 1998)
Uwe Krupp (signed by Detroit on July 7, 1998)
Tony Hrkac (traded to Dallas for future considerations on July 9, 1998)
Doug Brown (traded to Detroit for Petr Sykora, a pick in the 1999 draft, and future considerations on July 14, 1998)
Mike Richter (signed by the New York Rangers on July 15, 1998)
Frederic Chabot (claimed off waivers by Montreal on July 20, 1998)
Mikhail Shtalenkov (traded along with Jim Dowd to Edmonton for Eric Fichaud, Drake Berehowsky and Greg de Vries on October 1, 1998)
Al Iafrate (retired before the season began)

See also
1998 NHL Entry Draft
1998–99 NHL season

References
Here are your Nashville Predators (hockeynut.com)
Usenet post explaining draft rules
Usenet post discussing deals (see post 42 in thread)

External links
 1998 NHL Expansion Draft player stats at The Internet Hockey Database

Expansion Draft
Nashville Predators
National Hockey League expansion drafts